The Diocese of Darjeeling is a Latin Roman Catholic suffragan diocese situated in the north east of India, in the ecclesiastical province of the Metropolitan Archdiocese of Calcutta, yet depends on the missionary Roman Congregation for the Evangelization of Peoples.

It includes within its territory the independent (essentially Buddhist) Himalayan state of Bhutan, where Christianity is practiced by a tiny minority and proselytism is forbidden.

The cathedral episcopal see is the Marian Immaculate Conception Cathedral, in Darjeeling, West Bengal state, India.

Statistics 
As per 2014, it pastorally served 37,109 Catholics (2.6% of 1,433,000 total) on 9,521 km² in 54 parishes and 3 missions with 132 priests (82 diocesan, 50 religious), 455 lay religious (121 brothers, 334 sisters) and 40 seminarians.

History 
 Established on 15 February 1929 as Mission sui juris of Sikkim, on territories split off from Metropolitan Archdiocese of Calcutta and Apostolic Vicariate of Tatsienlu 打箭爐)
 Promoted on 16 June 1931 as Apostolic Prefecture of Sikkim
 Promoted on 8 August 1962 and renamed after ist see as Diocese of Darjeeling / 大吉嶺 (正體中文)
 Lost territory on 14 June 1997 to establish the Roman Catholic Diocese of Bagdogra.

Ordinaries 
(all Roman Rite) 

Ecclesiastical Superior of Sikkim
 Father Jules Elmire Douénel, Paris Foreign Missions Society (M.E.P.) (born France) (19 February 1929 – 16 June 1931 see below)

Apostolic Prefects of Sikkim
 Father Jules Elmire Douénel, M.E.P. (see above 19 February 1929 – retired 16 June 1931)
 Father Aurelio Gianora (14 May 1937 – death 1962)

Suffragan Bishops of Darjeeling
 Eric Benjamin (born India) (8 August 1962 – death 12 May 1994)
 Stephen Lepcha (born India) (14 June 1997 – ...).

See also 
 List of Catholic dioceses in India

References

Sources and external links 
 GCatholic.org with incumbent bio links - data for all sections
 www.catholic-hierarchy.org - Statistics on the Diocese of Darjeeling

Roman Catholic dioceses in India
Christianity in West Bengal
Catholic Church in Bhutan
1920s establishments in Sikkim